Samsun B.K. is a women's basketball club based in Samsun, Turkey, founded in 2003.

Achievements
Turkish Women's Basketball Second League:
Runners-up (1): 2007-08

Technical staff

2011-12 Roster

References

External links
Official website 

Women's basketball teams in Turkey
Basketball teams established in 2003

Sport in Samsun